Zhang Xiaoping (born April 1, 1982 in Xilinhot, Inner Mongolia) is a Chinese amateur boxer of Mongol ethnicity who won a gold medal as a light heavyweight in the 2008 Beijing Olympics.

Career
He won two matches at the world championships 2007 including an upset over Germany's world military champion Gottlieb Weiss but lost to veteran Yerkabulan Shinaliev and fell one win short of direct qualification.

At the qualifier he beat Mehdi Ghorbani and Dinesh Kumar, a loss to Jahon Qurbonov was meaningless.

In the final of the 2008 Beijing Olympics he beat Kenneth Egan of Ireland to win the gold medal. The final match was controversial in that the judges failed to record multiple points for Egan, the NBC announcers concurred on this point.

Beijing Olympic games results
2008 (as a Light heavyweight)
Defeated Mourad Sahraoui (Tunisia) 3-1
Defeated Artur Beterbiyev (Russia) 8-2
Defeated Abdelhafid Benchabla (Algeria) 12-7
Defeated Yerkebulan Shynaliyev (Kazakhstan) 4-4
Defeated Kenneth Egan (Ireland) 11-7

World amateur championships results
2007 (as a Light heavyweight)
Defeated Jasveer Singh (India) 17-3
Defeated Gottlieb Weiss (Germany) 17-13
Lost to Yerkebulan Shynaliyev (Kazakhstan) 5-14

References

World 2007
Qualifier

1982 births
Living people
Sportspeople from Inner Mongolia
People from Xilingol League
Light-heavyweight boxers
Chinese male boxers
Olympic boxers of China
Olympic gold medalists for China
Olympic medalists in boxing
Boxers at the 2008 Summer Olympics
Medalists at the 2008 Summer Olympics
Asian Games competitors for China
Boxers at the 2006 Asian Games
Chinese people of Mongolian descent